Phyllocnistis magnatella is a moth of the family Gracillariidae, known from Massachusetts, U.S.A. It was named by P.C. Zeller in 1873.

References

Phyllocnistis
Endemic fauna of the United States